A Sportsman's Sketches (also known as A Sportman's Notebook, The Hunting Sketches and Sketches from a Hunter's Album) is an 1852 cycle of short stories by Ivan Turgenev.  It was the first major writing that gained him recognition.

This work is part of the Russian realist tradition in that the narrator is usually an uncommitted observer of the people he meets.

Writing and publication 
Turgenev based many of these short stories on his own observations while hunting at his mother's estate at Spasskoye, where he learned of the abuse of the peasants and the injustices of the Russian system that constrained them.  The frequent abuse of Turgenev by his mother certainly had an effect on this work.

The stories were first published singly in The Contemporary before appearing in 1852 in book form.  Turgenev was about to give up writing when the first story, "Khor and Kalinich", was well received.   The work as a whole actually led to Turgenev's house arrest (part of the reason, the other being his epitaph to Nikolai Gogol) at Spasskoye.

The stories

Khor and Kalinych

Story of two peasants one who is extremely thrifty, and the other an idealist, both of whom work for a petty landowner named Polutykin.  This introduces the role of the narrator as the uncommitted observer.  Turgenev at once appears as a writer and an artist but also a social reformer and activist.  The separation of the two peasants plays a big role in later works by the author, as he explained in a speech given in 1860 where he talks about the dichotomy of his "Hamlet-like" and "Quixotic" characters.  The main idea here though is displaying the intelligence of the peasants and the idiocy of their master.  It is also perhaps one of his strongest arguments in favor of Westernization in Russia.

Yermolay and the Miller’s Wife
Story of the narrator's hunter friend and a night they spend at a miller's home.  This is the first sketch he appears in.  The man, Zverkov, gives the reader a clear idea of the injustices of serfdom, this being the main idea of this particular story.

Raspberry Water
Story of the narrator meeting and talking to two peasants at a little spring called Raspberry Water (which did exist and still exists in Russia).  Here the narrator is very distant, akin to early Realist narrators, and learns of the self-deprivation peasants take upon themselves through the recollections of the old peasant named Foggy.

District Doctor
Struck with fever in a small village, the narrator is visited by a district doctor who tells him a story of how he fell in love with a dying girl.  It is told from his perspective rather than the narrator's.

My Neighbor Radilov
Yermolay is with the narrator again.  The story consists of them meeting a landowner named Radilov.  They have dinner at his house and learn he is not a typical landowner and shows goodwill (he's not gloomy about his fate either).  He mentions when his wife died and how he didn't really shed a tear until he saw a fly crawl over her eye.  Radilov disappears at the end and the family he lived with does not know where he went.

Farmer Ovsyanikov

Poor landowner the narrator meets, who Turgenev uses to talk about the social ills of serfdom while avoiding the censors.  He does nothing more than sit and talk.

Lgov
Yermolay and the narrator go hunting and meet up with Old Knot, an old peasant who is the local fisherman and has held several ridiculous positions in the area.  This story is particularly noteworthy for its vivid character descriptions.  The group goes hunting in the lake with a pretentious hunter named Vladimir, sink the boat and then wade to shore filthy after great difficulty.

Bezhin Lea
The narrator gets lost in the woods and comes across a clearing, where he meets up with five peasant boys near a fire who are guarding the horses.  The narrator pretends to be asleep and the boys forget he is there and start talking about fairies and talking animals, stories that they believe to be true.  The beauty of the story is typically found in the innocence of the young boys.  Serfdom here is hidden in the background, never truly mentioned or argued against as in the other stories.

Kasyan from the Beautiful Lands

While in a carriage the narrator comes across a funeral procession and goes to Yudin village to get a new axle when theirs breaks.  There he meets Kasyan, a fifty-year-old dwarf who lives in the village and who belongs to some unnamed religious sect.  He takes them to get a new axle and the narrator notices how at one he seems with his environment and incredibly generous.  Kasyan establishes his hatred of established society through his glorification of the world of folklore.

Bailiff
Story about the bailiff (Sofron) of a landowner friend of the narrator who is more in control of the land than Arkady Penochkin.  He uses the peasants and steals their money from loans.  This story is one of the most vivid examples of the peasantry's exploitation.

The Office
The narrator comes upon a small hut and travels to a village after speaking with an old man there.  He comes across a run-down shack that is the main office of the local landowner.  He stays there and overhears the head clerk abusing his powers and learns how he uses Losnyakova to abuse the peasants, for example sending away the lover of a young man so they cannot get married.  The main idea here is the presentation of the ridiculous bureaucracy created to control the peasants.

Loner
At night in a droshky, the narrator comes across a man, Foma, in the forest who watches over his landowner's property so peasants don't steal wood.  He learns the man's wife left him and their children alone and finds his home incredibly depressing.  Foma eventually hears a peasant chopping down a tree and they go out to confront him.  The forester takes him to his home and threatens to turn him into the landowner.  The narrator tries to buy the peasant's wood so he can be set free, and though they fight at first, Foma eventually agrees and pushes the man out the door.  Unlike the previous stories, this work was not featured in “The Contemporary” and was only later added to the sketches in 1852.

Two Landowners
Story of two different landowners the narrator knows, with descriptions of mistreatment of the peasants including beatings and descriptions of their miserable huts.  This again, gives the reader more callous examples of the treatment of the peasantry.

Lebedyan
Story about a village where the narrator comes across the horse fair.  Of particular interest is the lieutenant Khlopakov, who uses catch phrases out of context regardless if they sound strange, which amuses his friend Zhukov.  The narrator looks at horses and decides to purchase one, which ends up being lame but he gives up trying to get his money back for it when he realizes the seller's scheme.  Turgenev's intentions here were to display the typical events at a local fair.

Tatyana Borisovna and her Nephew
Story about the modest landowner Tatyana whom everyone loves because she is so generous.  In spite of being illiterate she is generous to everyone and does not care for typical dealings that landowners spend their time on and does not care for other women landowners in her area.  In the story her nephew Andryusha (an orphan) comes to live with her and loves to draw.  He eventually gains the interest of Pyotr Benevolensky, a local collegiate counsellor who is a minor acquaintance of Tatyana, who then takes him to St. Petersburg to be trained in art.  When he returns, after asking his aunt for money through the mail several times, she finds he has become Benevolensky and is corrupted.  He is fat and annoying and spends his time poorly singing words to songs written by Glinka.  Her friends stop visiting her because he is so annoying.

Death
In this story the narrator opens with a hunting story concerning his neighbor.  They find the trees in the area dying with many fallen onto the ground because of a terrible frost (this is an actual event from Russia in 1840).  After this he and his friend come upon a peasant who they are told has been smashed by a tree and they watch him die.  This reminds the narrator of several stories he remembers about dying and he uses them to explain how the Russian character presents itself when dying.  Each character continues as if performing a ritual, not lamenting or even caring.  One old woman, with her final breath, reaches for a ruble under her pillow to pay the priest who says her last rites.  Here Turgenev appears to be commenting on the isolation of human personality in the face of nature.

Singers

The narrator comes across a “terrible village” and goes to a tavern set at the end of a ravine.  In the tavern he finds that some locals are having a singing contest.  The one, Yakov, has the gift of technical prowess.  The other, Yasha, has natural talent.  Yakov goes first and the group believes he's won due to the skill he displays but when Yasha sings, he sings beautifully with the “collective voice of the Russian identity,” leading everyone to cry with no discussion of his skill afterward.  Yakov stammers that he won and they are about to drink, but the narrator is disturbed by this since he found the scene so beautiful amongst the horrible surroundings, and he goes outside to sleep while they drink.  He leaves while hearing peasant boys calling to each other in the night.

Pyotr Petrovich Karataev
While at a post, the narrator meets a lower, uneducated landowner named Karataev who has lost his land because of an IOU.  He learns from him that he once fell in love with a peasant girl named Matroyna, owned by another landowner.  He attempts to buy her from the woman, but she forbids it because she simply does not want to and sends her away to another village.  Karataev, in desperation, finds her and brings her home where he hides her for a time, eluding authorities by placing her away from his home.  In the end she gives herself up and Karataev goes off to Moscow, where the narrator finds him later happy amongst friends but completely broke.

Meeting
While out hunting, the narrator happens to witness the meeting of a peasant girl who is in love with a pampered, pompous valet.  When he comes he treats her disdainfully and leaves her to say he is going away after announcing he cannot marry her.  The girl sheds tears and the narrator goes to her when she almost collapses, but she runs away when she notices him.

Hamlet of the Shchigrovsky District

In this story the narrator spends the evening at a party of a landowner named Alexander G.  Here Turgenev gives excellent descriptions and parodies of the nobility.  While attempting to go to sleep, the narrator finds his roommate unable to sleep as well and finds out that he is a man who has realized his uniqueness amongst the upper class, even though he is considered a wit.  He is forever cursed to deep introspection and finds in himself nothing save a molded being with no true life.  He leaves early in the morning without saying goodbye and the narrator never learns his name.

Chertopkhanov and Nedopyuskin
While hunting with Yermolay, the narrator comes across the landowner Chertopkhanov.  He goes away on his horse and another man comes up, his friend Nedopyuskin.  Chertopkhanov is the inheritor of a mortgaged little village called Unsleepy Hollow.  His friend, Nedopyuskin, became close to him when the former saved him from a crowd of nobles who were tormenting him for being the inheritor of an estate despite the fact that he was so completely devoid of any bit of notoriety for anything.  The two bachelors became the best of friends and live together at Unsleepy Hollow in peaceful tranquility in spite of the disrepair of the area.  They embody the “loner” figure Turgenev was so interested in, able to live independently in the system.

The End of Chertopkhanov
Sequel to the previous story, though published much later in 1872.  It was originally not part of the sketches.  This story is more sequential than the previous, detailing the end of the landowner up to his death.  He faces three misfortunes.  The first is his love Masha leaving him in true “gypsy” spirit.  The second is Nedopyuskin dying of a stroke.  The third and final is the loss of his horse Malek Adel, the envy of local landowners who know of Chertopkhanov.  One night it is stolen and he does everything in his power to find it, eventually coming across the horse at a fair.  He buys it back and brings it home, but something bothers him about it.  He begins to realize that the horse is not truly Malek Adel but one that looks like it and in despair he eventually shoots the animal in the head and stays in his bed afterwards.  He no longer looks like himself, but when his servant comes up to him the last bit of his being comes forth and he declares that the nobleman Chertopkhanov is dying and no one can stand in his way.

Living Relic
This story was originally not part of the sketches either and appeared in another collection of stories first in 1874.  Here, the narrator comes back to his home estate to find a beautiful servant named Lukeria in a horrible state.  After falling from a porch she succumbs to an unknown digestive disorder (not explicitly stated, but implied) that reduces her to an unmoving, skeletal figure.  She spends her time in the shed in the summer and near the house in the winter, moved about by the house servants who remain.  The narrator is shaken by her disturbing ability to accept her fate, regardless of how terrible it may be.  She is completely unable to move and finds her days accented only by the occasional sounds of new birds in the shed, smells, or a rabbit that may occasionally come in to visit her.  She eventually dies in peace, completely aware that the day was coming because she saw it in her dreams.  This story is slightly different from the others because of the inclusion of the “unreal” found in Lukeria's dream states.  The narrator is heartbroken by her condition, but is surprised to find her happy with life in spite of her state.  Suggestions have been made that she is so happy because in her inability to move she is also unable to sin.

The Clatter of Wheels
Also added later to the sketches, but published after the original group in 1874.  In this story Yermolay and the narrator find they are almost out of shot, so they decide to go to Tula to get more and fetch a peasant named Filofey.  He takes the narrator there, Yermolay stays behind, but on the way hears a carriage clattering far in the distance that he is sure is a group of bandits who will surely murder them when they catch up.  The carriage slowly overcomes them in spite of what they try and eventually comes in front of them.  Several men are on it singing and laughing, completely drunk.  Filofey tries to steer around but every time he does the head carriage moves into their way.  When they come to a bridge the carriage stops and the largest of the men approaches.  The narrator is sure they are to be killed but is surprised when he finds the drunk man only asking for a bit of money for drinks, stating they have just come from a wedding and want a bit more to celebrate.  The narrator and Filofey are relieved and joke with each other about the event, but learn later on that on that very night a merchant was killed on the road and had his carriage stolen.  Though uncertain and still joking, they wonder if the carriage that passed them was not in fact from a wedding at all.

Forest and Steppe
The traditional ending to the sketches, found in every edition.  Here, Turgenev gives the readers detailed and beautiful descriptions of the hunter's life, ending the collection.

Work 
1895 - A Sportsman's Sketches write by Ivan Turgenev translated by Constance Garnett

Unfinished works

The Russian German
An incomplete, short fragment first published in 1964 and never part of the original sketches.  Here, the narrator comes across a German landowner in Russia.  It is likely he kept this sketch out and never finished it because it did not present a picture of the typical, “Russian” landowner.  Here though, he seems to be hinting that the “game” of the sketches is in fact the evils of serfdom and the failures of landowners.

The Reformer and the Russian German
Another incomplete, though slightly longer, fragment.  This may have been a later version of the previous fragment or another fragment itself.  It's completely different, with different characters, and again provides the readers with examples of the failures and cruelties of serfdom.

Legacy 

This series of short stories revealed Turgenev's unique talent as a short story writer. Evidently it greatly influenced all Russian short story writers of the late 19th and early 20th centuries, such as Anton Chekhov, Ivan Bunin, Alexander Kuprin and many others.

Other world writers also admired Turgenev's style. Sherwood Anderson was particularly influenced by Turgenev's literature. He considered A Sportsman's Sketches to be a paradigm for his own short stories.

More recently, Turgenev has been criticized for his somewhat idealized characterization of muzhiks. Turgenev's muzhiks have been compared to other noble savages in 19th-century fiction (such as American Indians in works by J. F. Cooper).

External links

English version of text
Full text of A Sportsman's Sketches in the original Russian at Alexei Komarov's Internet Library
 

1852 short story collections
Russian short story collections
Works by Ivan Turgenev